The Weld Club is a private male-only social club in Perth, Western Australia. Founded in 1871 as a gentlemen's club, it is named after Frederick Weld, the chronologically first patron of the club and the Governor of Western Australia at the time.

Building
, the club occupies a building designed by Talbot Hobbs and constructed in 1892 by the Bunning Brothers, the founders of Bunnings, for the organisation. It is situated at the corner of The Esplanade and Barrack Street, immediately across the street from Stirling Gardens. Appraised for conservation work, it is heritage-listed and has a number of histories of both the club and building published.

See also
Karrakatta Club
Western Australian Club

References

External links
 

1871 establishments in Australia
Clubs and societies in Western Australia
Organizations established in 1871
Organisations based in Perth, Western Australia
Gentlemen's clubs in Australia